Qarakeçdi is a village in the Lachin District of Azerbaijan.

History 
The village was known as Leninkend during the Soviet period until it was renamed in 1999 to Qarakeçdi.

The village was located in the Armenian-occupied territories surrounding Nagorno-Karabakh, coming under the control of ethnic Armenian forces in May 1992 during the First Nagorno-Karabakh War. The village subsequently became part of the breakaway Republic of Artsakh as part of its Kashatagh Province, referred to as Lernahovit, and previously Yeznagomer. It was returned to Azerbaijan as part of the 2020 Nagorno-Karabakh ceasefire agreement.

References 

Populated places in Lachin District